The Raysipotra are a Muslim community found in the state of Gujarat in India and a province of Sindh in Pakistan. They are one of a number of communities of pastoral nomads found in the Banni region of Kutch.

History and origin

The Raysipotra get their name from Raysojee, who belonged to the Dal Muslim community. They are a small Maldhari community found in the village of Bhirandiara in the Banni region of Kutch. They are also found in the village of Gadhiyado. Their habitat is located in the heart of the Banni  region, a semi-desert ecosystem. The climate is dry and hot, and pastoral lifestyle is the only option for the inhabitants. They speak Kutchi with many Sindhi loanwords.

Present circumstances

The community has no sub-divisions, and are an endogamous community, but do marry with other Samma . They prefer parallel cousin and cross cousin marriages.

The Raysipotra are a community of Maldhari cattle breeders. They take their cattle to bazaars of Bhuj. In addition to cattle rearing, they also raise goats and buffaloes. Like other Kutchi communities, many of them have migrated to other parts of India in search of employment. They are Sunni Muslims  and most follow the Barelvi tradition.

See also

Maldhari

References

Social groups of Gujarat
Tribes of Kutch
Maldhari communities
Muslim communities of India
Sindhi tribes

Sindhi tribes in India
Muslim communities of Gujarat